Atalar (also Romanized as ‘Aţālar) is a village in Aqabad Rural District, in the Central District of Gonbad-e Qabus County, Golestan Province, Iran. At the 2006 census, its population was 1,054, in 202 families.

References 

Populated places in Gonbad-e Kavus County